Nangiarkulangara is a relatively small town situated near Haripad, Alappuzha district in the state of Kerala, India.Nangiarkulangara is the satellite town of Haripad city and part of Haripad Municipality.Nangiarkulangara is the central point of three major towns in central Travancore. Roads from Haripad, Mavelikara, Thrikkunnappuzha and Kayamkulam meet at this pivot point. It is also known for the Sri Krishna temple which is in the centre of the town. The national highway NH 66 passes through this town.

NTPC Limited, whose Rajiv Gandhi (Kayamkulam) Combined Cycle Power Plant is located at nearby Choolatheruvu, has a portion of its township at Nangiarkulangara, very close to NH 47. In fact, originally, this was the temporary township, when the main township, named Shaktipuram, closer to the power plant, was under construction during 1998-2000.

Nangiarkulangara is notable for its educational institutions the famous T.K. Madhava Memorial College having graduate & post graduate courses ; Bethany Girls School which is one of the best schools in the district and its CBSE school is Bethany Central school.

Nangiakulangra also has the famous Major Sreekrisha temple under Travancore Dewasom board.

Cities and towns in Alappuzha district